Sichuan Economic Daily, also known as Sichuan Jingji Ribao, is a simplified Chinese newspaper published in the People's Republic of China.  It is a comprehensive economic broadsheet newspaper,  first published in April 1984, and its predecessor was Sichuan Economic Information News (四川经济信息报).

Sichuan Economic Daily is an important public opinion tool of the Sichuan Provincial Committee of the Chinese Communist Party (中共四川省委) and the Sichuan Provincial Government (四川省政府) to guide the Sichuan Province's economic work. It is the only state media (官方媒体) of the economy in Sichuan Province and the earliest economic newspaper in the Western China.

References

Mass media in Sichuan
Newspapers published in Asia
Publications established in 1984
Daily newspapers published in China
Chinese-language newspapers (Simplified Chinese)